The 2023 FIA World Cup for Cross-Country Bajas is the fifth season of the FIA World Cup for Cross-Country Bajas; an annual competition for baja-style rally raid events for cars, buggies, and side-by-sides held in multiple countries.

Calendar
The initial calendar for the 2023 world cup features eight cross-country baja events. Some events on the schedule are shared with the 2023 FIM Bajas World Cup.

Regulation
The following groups and classes are allowed:
Group T1 - Prototype Cross-Country Vehicles
T1.1 - T1 4x4 - Petrol and Diesel
T1.2 - T1 4x2 - Petrol and Diesel
Group T2 - Series Production Cross-Country Vehicles - Petrol and Diesel
Group T3 - Lightweight Prototypes Cross-Country Vehicles
Group T4 - Lightweight Series Production Cross-Country Side-by-Side Vehicles

The FIA awards the world cup to drivers, co-drivers, teams, T3 and T4 drivers and T4 teams.

Teams and drivers

Results

Overall

T3

T4

Championship standings

Points system
 Points for final positions are awarded as per the following table:

For the 2023 season points will be awarded to the top five finishing positions of each leg on each event. These points will only be awarded if the driver finishes in the overall classification of each event. If they do not then no leg points are awarded, but the following vehicles will not move up a position for leg points.

FIA World Cup for Drivers, Co-Drivers, and Teams

Drivers' & Co-Drivers' championships

Teams championship

FIA T3 World Cup for Drivers

Drivers' championship

FIA T4 World Cup for Drivers and Teams

Drivers' championship

Teams championship

References

External links 
 

Cross Country Rally World Cup
World Cup for Cross-Country Bajas
World Cup for Cross-Country Bajas